League table for teams participating in Ykkönen, the second tier of the Finnish Soccer League system, in 1990.

League table

Promotion/relegation playoff

KPV Kokkola - Jaro Pietarsaari  0-1
Jaro Pietarsaari - KPV Kokkola  4-2

Jaro Pietarsaari promoted, KPV Kokkola relegated.

See also
Veikkausliiga (Tier 1)

References

Ykkönen seasons
2
Finland
Finland